Doyerea is a monotypic genus of flowering plants belonging to the family Cucurbitaceae. The only species is D. emetocathartica.

Its native range is Mexico to Venezuela, Caribbean.

References

Cucurbitaceae
Monotypic Cucurbitaceae genera